Montriond is a commune in the Haute-Savoie department in the Auvergne-Rhône-Alpes region in south-eastern France.

It is just north of the ski resorts of Morzine and Avoriaz in the Portes du Soleil ski resorts area. Just east lies Lac de Montriond, a small lake. Montriond's village centre features a small supermarket, ski/outdoors retailer and several restaurants as well as a tourist information office and a Mairie.

See also
Morzine
Avoriaz
Portes Du Soleil
Communes of the Haute-Savoie department

References

Communes of Haute-Savoie